Robert Clive Napper (born 25 February 1966) is an English serial killer and rapist. He has been convicted of two murders, one manslaughter, two rapes, and two attempted rapes. He was sentenced to indefinite detention at Broadmoor Hospital on 18 December 2008 for the manslaughter of Rachel Nickell on 15 July 1992. He was previously convicted of the 1993 double murder of Samantha Bisset and her daughter Jazmine Bisset.

Napper has been diagnosed with paranoid schizophrenia as well as Asperger's Syndrome.

Early life
Robert Napper is the eldest child of Brian Napper, a driving instructor, and his wife Pauline. Born in Erith, southeast London, Napper was brought up in nearby Abbey Wood. His background was troubled and dysfunctional. The marriage of his parents was violent and Napper witnessed his father abusing his mother. His parents divorced when he was nine and he and his siblings (two brothers and a sister) were placed in foster care and underwent psychiatric treatment for six years at the Maudsley Hospital in Camberwell. 

Napper was socially awkward at school, where he was shunned by his peers who later described Napper as being "despised". At age 13, Napper underwent a personality change after a family friend sexually assaulted him on a camping holiday. The offender was jailed, but Napper became introverted, obsessively tidy, and reclusive, according to his mother. He also bullied his siblings and spied on his sister while she was naked.

Criminal activities
In 1986, Napper first came to police attention after being convicted of an offence with an airgun. In October 1989, police had rejected information conveyed in a phone call from Napper's mother that her son had admitted to committing a rape on Plumstead Common. No case apparently matched the evidence. However, it emerged at the time of Napper's second conviction, that the rape of a 30-year-old woman, in front of her children, eight weeks earlier, had been reported to have occurred in a house which backed on to Plumstead Common. At this point, Pauline Napper broke off all contact with her son.

On 15 July 1992 on Wimbledon Common, Napper stabbed the young mother Rachel Nickell 49 times in front of her son Alex, then aged two, who clung on to his mother's body begging her to wake up. Napper was questioned about unsolved attacks on other women during the year, but was eliminated from inquiries.

In November 1993, in the Bisset home in Plumstead, Napper stabbed 27-year-old Samantha Bisset in her neck and chest, killing her, and then sexually assaulted and smothered her four-year-old daughter, Jazmine Jemima Bisset. In her sitting room, Napper mutilated Bisset's body, taking away body parts as a trophy. The crime scene was reportedly so grisly that the police photographer assigned to the case was forced to take two years' leave after witnessing it.

After a fingerprint belonging to Napper was recovered from Samantha's flat, he was arrested, and charged with the murders of Samantha and Jazmine Bisset, in May 1994. Napper was convicted at the Old Bailey in October 1995. He also admitted two rapes and two attempted rapes at this time. From the time of the first Old Bailey trial, he has been held at Broadmoor. In December 1995, he was questioned about Nickell's death but denied any involvement.

Napper is also believed to have committed most or all of the attacks attributed to the "Green Chain Rapist" (named after the Green Chain Walk – a string of leafy pathways linking large parts of south east London) who carried out at least 70 savage attacks across south-east London over a four-year period ending in 1994. The earliest of the 'Green Chain' rapes have been linked to Napper, and were those he admitted to in 1995. Napper is known to have kept detailed records of the sites of potential and actual attacks on women. During the investigation into the rapes, Napper had been eliminated due to his 6' 2" height, as detectives had decided to exclude anyone over 6' based on the description of a 5' 7" rapist. However, there are conflicting witness reports of the rapist's height and Napper walked with a stoop.

The investigation to find Nickell's murderer resulted in the attempted prosecution of an innocent man, Colin Stagg, until, in 2004, advances in DNA profiling revealed Napper's connection to the case. On 18 December 2008, Napper was convicted of the manslaughter of Nickell on the grounds of diminished responsibility. He also admitted to four other attacks on women. Napper was sentenced to indefinite detention at Broadmoor Hospital. In his summing up at the Old Bailey, Mr Justice Griffiths Williams said to Napper: "You are on any view a very dangerous man".

Depictions in popular culture
Napper was portrayed by Jack Riddiford in the 2021 miniseries Deceit, which retold the story of Operation Edzell.

See also
Murder of Penny Bell – unsolved 1991 murder in London that was once linked to Napper
Murder of Alison Shaughnessy – 1991 murder in London that was once linked to Nickell's
Batman rapist – unidentified UK serial rapist who has eluded capture since 1991
House for sale rapist – unidentified UK serial rapist who has eluded capture since 1979; suspected to have been John Cannan, who is the prime suspect in the disappearance of estate agent Suzy Lamplugh

References

Further reading
 Laurence J. Alison, Marie Eyre: Killer in the Shadows: The Monstrous Crimes of Robert Napper. Pennant Books 2009, .
 Kevin Brewer: Psychology and Crime. Heinemann Educational Publishers 2000, .
 Paul Britton: The Jigsaw Man. Corgi Books 1998, .
 Colin Evans: A Question of Evidence: The Casebook of Great Forensic Controversies, from Napoleon to O.J. Wiley 2002, .
 Mike Fielder: The Murder of Rachel Nickell. John Blake 2000, .
 Alex Handscombe: Letting Go: A true story of murder, loss and survival by Rachel Nickell's son. Harper Element 2017, .
 André Handscombe: The Last Thursday in July. Century 1996 / Arrow 1997, .
 Alan Jackaman: Napper: Through a Glass Darkly Waterside Press, 2019 .
 David Kessler: Rachel Nickell, House of Solomon Ltd, 2001, .
 Keith Pedder: The Rachel Files, John Blake 2002, .
 Keith Pedder: Murder on the Common: The Secret Story of the Murder That Shocked a Nation. John Blake 2003, .
 Colin Stagg, David Kessler: Who Really Killed Rachel? Greenzone Publishing 1999, .
 Colin Stagg, David Kessler: The Lizzie James Conspiracy. House of Solomon 2001, .
 Colin Stagg, Ted Hynds: Pariah: Colin Stagg. Pennant Publishing 2007, .
 Brent E. Turvey: Criminal Profiling: An Introduction to Behavioral Evidence Analysis Academic Press 2002, .

External links
 LE CRIME DE ROBERT NAPPER (British Media Coverage of Napper's Crimes)
 THE RACHEL NICKELL CASE

1966 births
1992 murders in the United Kingdom
1993 murders in the United Kingdom
20th-century English criminals
Criminals from London
English murderers of children
English people convicted of manslaughter
English people convicted of murder
English people convicted of rape
English rapists
English serial killers
Living people
Male serial killers
Murder in London
Necrophiles
People acquitted by reason of insanity
People convicted of murder by England and Wales
People detained at Broadmoor Hospital
People from Erith
People with Asperger syndrome
People with schizophrenia